bet-at-home.com AG is a European online gambling and sports betting company that was founded in 1999.

Their product range includes sportsbook, casino, live-casino, vegas, and virtual.

Corporate history 

bet-at-home.com was founded in December 1999, in Wels Upper Austria, by Jochen Dickinger and Franz Ömer. In March 2000 www.bet-at-home.com went online. Initially the business focused its activities solely on online sports betting. Two months after the website was launched, the Livescore service, www.livescore.cc, was launched and this led to the relaunch of the bet-at-home.com website in 2002. With the start of the new online casino in November 2005, the website was again redesigned. In the following year (2006), bet-at-home.com launched its poker platform. In 2008, the product range broadened with the relaunch of a new online casino. A short while later, in June 2009, bet-at-home.com launched their new product line Games. Since September of the same year, live betting has been offered on various sporting events. Founded in 1999 as a limited company, in May 2004 the capital investments increased and bet-at-home.com transformed into a joint stock corporation. In December of the same year, the corporation was listed on the stock exchange.

Further capital increases in subsequent years followed. Between 2006 and 2009 the corporation held a 60-percent share of Racebets GmbH. bet-at-home.com AG is a part of the "BetClic Everest SAS Group", which is one of the leading French companies in the industry of online gaming and sports betting and that acquired the majority vote in April 2009. bet-at-home.com AG’s shares are listed on the Stock Exchange in Frankfurt, Xetra. In 2012 there was a change from the Open Market to the Entry Standard of the Frankfurt Stock Exchange.

On 31 October 2012 co-founder Jochen Dickinger gave up his position as CEO and was succeeded by Michael Quatember. In August 2013 the new website went online; the second relaunch in the company’s history on the offers at www.bet-at-home.com. In December 2013 a mobile version of the site was launched. In 2015 the company extended its product range by Virtual. The company was approved for the Regulated Market on the Frankfurt Stock Exchange in August 2016. Admission to the "Prime Standard" segment was granted. On 3 February 2017, the shares were admitted to the SDAX.

In February 2017, casino games were added to the poker software. In November 2017, the product group "Games" was replaced by "Vegas" and the casino app was introduced. In June 2018, the Sports app was introduced. With the launch of the esports channel in September 2018 the company added a new product.

Marco Falchetto has been appointed member of the board of the bet-at-home.com AG with effect from 21 February 2022. Franz Ömer and Michael Quatember left the board at their own request at the regular end of their appointment in late February 2022.

Corporate structure 

bet-at-home.com AG is based in Düsseldorf and acts as the holding and is responsible for the listing of bet-at-home.com’s shares. The company holds 100% of bet-at-home.com Entertainment GmbH. The company’s Linz office is primarily responsible for the ongoing technology transfer within the company. The company’s international licences for online sports betting as well as its online gaming licences for casino and games are held by bet-at-home.com Holding Ltd. based in St. Julian’s, Malta.

Betclic Everest Group SAS with a stake of 53.9% is a stable core shareholder of the company with a long-term approach. Betclic Everest Group, based in Paris, France, is a European corporation with stakes in online gaming companies based in France. The Société des Bains de Mer (SBM), based in Monaco (ISIN: MC0000031187), and the LOV Group, founded by Stéphane Courbit and focused on companies with in-creasing growth and deregulation, have equal shares in Betclic Everest Group SAS.

The bet-at-home.com management holds 1% of shares, leading to free float of 45.1% in total on reporting date 31 December 2021.

Product history

Sportsbook 
Sportsbook is bet-at-home’s core business. In 2000, the company launched its first sportsbook offer on www.bet-at-home.com. In the fiscal year 2021 (as of December 2021), the betting offer included more than 1,000,000 events for more than 50 different sports and 206,000 live events. bet-at-home was an early mover in their launch of e-Sports as a new sports betting category.

In 2021, the gross gaming revenue of bet-at-home.com’s sportsbook amounted to €56.6 million.

Casino 
bet-at-home.com via one of its subsidiaries has a Maltese gaming license, that acquires them the right to operate an online casino. After the launch of their sportsbook product range, the second main product, the bet-at-home.com casino was launched in 2005.

Virtual 
In April 2015, virtual bets were added to the offer. This product is about the virtual simulation of different sports. Currently (as of March 2022), it is possible to place bets on football, tennis, dog racing, basketball and horse racing.

In 2020, the gross gaming revenue of bet-at-home.com’s online gaming (casino, games, virtual) amounted to €2.8 million.

Controversy 
On 7 July 2022, the Gambling Commission revoked bet-at-home.com's gambling license in the United Kingdom, citing lack of responsible gaming measures, and Anti-Money Laundering procedure.

Notes

External links
 

Online gambling companies of Germany
Online gambling companies of Austria
Online gambling companies of Malta
Bookmakers
Gambling companies established in 1999
Companies based in Düsseldorf
1999 establishments in Austria